Vadim Danilevskiy is a retired Ukrainian football player.

Career
Vadim Danilevskiy started his career with Tekstylschyk Chernihiv in the city of Chernihiv. In 1996 he moved to the main club of the city Desna Chernihiv where he played 22 matches and scored 1 goal until 1998. He also played 3 matches with Slavutich-ChNPP" Slavutich and then he returned Desna Chernihiv in 1998 for two season where he played 24 matches and scored 1 goal. In 2000 he ended his career in the club of Chernihiv.

References

External links 
 Vadim Danilevskiy at footballfacts.ru

1972 births
Living people
Footballers from Chernihiv
FC Desna Chernihiv players
FC Cheksyl Chernihiv players
FC Slavutych players
Ukrainian footballers
Ukrainian Second League players
Association football midfielders